Gun Talk may refer to:

 Gun Talk (radio program)
 Gun Talk (album), by MC Just-Ice
 Gun Talk (film), 1947 film